José Ramón de la Torre Martínez (August 2, 1935 – September 30, 2022) was a Puerto Rican academic who was the chairman of the board of directors of the Institute of Puerto Rican Culture (ICP) and the Luis A. Ferré Performing Arts Center. De la Torre served as the University of Puerto Rico's ninth president from February 1, 2010, until his resignation on February 11, 2011 following the 2010–2011 University of Puerto Rico strikes.

Education
De la Torre received his baccalaureate and master's degrees from the Department of Hispanic Studies of University of Puerto Rico, Rio Piedras (UPRRP), and his Ph.D. in Philosophy and Letters from the Complutense University of Madrid, in Madrid, Spain.

Career
He was a Professor of Hispanic Literature at UPRRP, where he also served as dean of the Faculty of Humanities.

He was also a founding member of the Puerto Rican Association of University Professors (APPU) in 1962 and co-founder of the program of translation of the UPR.

On January 27, 2010, he was elected by UPR's Board of Trustees to serve as the university's ninth president. De la Torre was sworn in on February 1, 2010.

On February 11, 2011, he presented his resignation to the presidency of the University of Puerto Rico.

See also 
 University of Puerto Rico
 2010 University of Puerto Rico Strike

References 

Living people
Complutense University of Madrid alumni
University of Puerto Rico alumni
University of Puerto Rico faculty
1935 births